Bartholomew Garvey (1921 – 12 December 2002), known as Batt Garvey, was an Irish Gaelic footballer who played for club sides Dingle and Geraldines and at inter-county level with the Kerry senior football team.

Career

Garvey first played Gaelic football with Dingle before lining out with the Geraldines club in Dublin. He made his first appearance at inter-county level with Kerry during the 1945 Munster Championship. Garvey won four Munster Championship medals in total, however, the highlight of his brief inter-county career was the 1946 All-Ireland final replay defeat of Roscommon. He also lined out in the 1947 All-Ireland final defeat by Cavan at the Polo Grounds in New York. Garvey also won two Railway Cup medals with Munster, the second as team captain.

Personal life and death

Garvey was born in Ventry, County Kerry, but spent his entire adult life in Dublin where he was principal of St. Joseph's Boys' National School in Terenure. He died at the Mater Private Hospital on 12 December 2002.

Honours

Kerry
All-Ireland Senior Football Championship: 1946
Munster Senior Football Championship: 1946, 1947, 1948, 1950

Munster
Railway Cup: 1948, 1949 (c)

References

1921 births
2002 deaths
Dingle Gaelic footballers
Heads of schools in Ireland
Kerry inter-county Gaelic footballers
Munster inter-provincial Gaelic footballers